Igor Emiliyevich Feld (21 February 1941 – 15 February 2007) was a Soviet athlete. He competed in the men's pole vault at the 1964 Summer Olympics.

References

1941 births
2007 deaths
Athletes (track and field) at the 1964 Summer Olympics
Soviet male pole vaulters
Olympic athletes of the Soviet Union
Athletes from Saint Petersburg
Universiade bronze medalists for the Soviet Union
Universiade medalists in athletics (track and field)
Medalists at the 1965 Summer Universiade